Abdul Nasir (born 15 December 1983) is a Pakistani cricketer. He made his first-class debut in the 2000–01 season.

References

External links
 

1983 births
Living people
Pakistani cricketers
Peshawar cricketers